Ceisler is a surname. Notable people with the surname include:

Larry Ceisler, American public relations manager
Rich Ceisler (1956–2014), American stand-up comedian, author, and director